Engin Öztonga (born 10 August 1978 in Kullar) is a Turkish retired footballer who played as a midfielder.

Öztonga previously played for Kocaelispor and Gaziantepspor in the Turkish Super Lig.

Honours 
 Kocaelispor
Turkish Cup (2): 1997, 2002

References

1978 births
Living people
Turkish footballers
Turkey under-21 international footballers
Turkey youth international footballers
Süper Lig players
Kocaelispor footballers
Gaziantepspor footballers
Eskişehirspor footballers
Diyarbakırspor footballers
Çaykur Rizespor footballers

Association football midfielders